Gordelivy ("Proud") was a Project 1135M Burevestnik-class ("Petrel") Guard Ship (SKR) or 'Krivak II'-class frigate that served with the Soviet and Russian Navies. Launched on 3 May 1978, the vessel operated as part of the Pacific Fleet as an anti-submarine vessel, with an armament built around the Metel Anti-Ship Complex. Gordelivy  operated in the Indian and Pacific Oceans. The ship was involved in the recovery of a BOR-4 prototype spaceplane in 1982 and undertook a friendly visit to Mumbia, India, in 1985. Decommissioned and sold to a South Korean company in 1994, Gordelivy left Russia on 27 June 1995 to be broken up.

Design and development
Gordelivy was one of eleven Project 1135M ships launched between 1975 and 1981. Project 1135, the Burevestnik ("Petrel") class, was envisaged by the Soviet Navy as a less expensive complement to the Project 1134A Berkut A (NATO reporting name 'Kresta II') and Project 1134B Berkut B (NATO reporting name 'Kara') classes of anti-submarine ships. Project 1135M was an improvement developed in 1972 with slightly increased displacement and heavier guns compared with the basic 1135. The design, by N. P. Sobolov, combined a powerful missile armament with good seakeeping for a blue water role. The ships were designated Guard Ship (SKR) to reflect the Soviet strategy of creating protected areas for friendly submarines close to the coast and the substantially greater anti-ship capability compared to the earlier members of the class. NATO forces called the vessels 'Krivak II'-class frigates.

Power was provided by two M7K power sets, each consisting of a combination of a  DK59 and a  M62 gas turbine arranged in a COGAG installation and driving one fixed-pitch propeller. The ship’s complement was 194, including 23 officers.

Armament and sensors
Gordelivy was designed for anti-submarine warfare around four URPK-5 Rastrub missiles (NATO reporting name SS-N-14 'Silex'), backed up by a pair of quadruple launchers for  torpedoes and a pair of RBU-6000  Smerch-2 anti-submarine rocket launchers. Both the URPK-5 and the torpedoes also had secondary anti-ship capabilities. Defence against aircraft was provided by forty 4K33 OSA-M (SA-N-4 'Gecko') surface to air missiles which were launched from two sets of ZIF-122 launchers, each capable of launching two missiles. Two  AK-100 guns were mounted aft.

The ship had a well-equipped sensor suite, including a single MR-310A Angara-A air/surface search radar, Don navigation radar, the MP-401S Start-S ESM radar system and the Spectrum-F laser warning system. Fire control for the guns consisted of a MR-143 Lev-214 radar. An extensive sonar complex was fitted, including MG-332T Titan-2T, which was mounted in a bow radome, and MG-325 Vega. The vessel was also equipped with the PK-16 decoy-dispenser system which used chaff as a form of missile defense.

Construction and career
Laid down by on 26 July 1977 with the yard number 166 at the Yantar Shipyard in Kaliningrad, Gordelivy was launched on 3 May 1977. The ship was the eighth of the class built at the yard. The ship was named for a Russian word that can be translated as proud. The vessel was commissioned on 20 September and was initially based at Baltiysk. However, the Soviet Union was extending its Asian presence, and expanding the Pacific Fleet with large combat vessels of comparable capability to the European fleets. Therefore Gordelivy was allocated to the Pacific Fleet and set off from the Baltic Sea for Vladivostok in 1979.

Once in service, Gordelivy operated in the Indian and Pacific Oceans, operating as far as the Arabian Peninsula. On 4 June 1982, the vessel was part of the flotilla that recovered one of the BOR-4 prototype spaceplanes. However, the main role that the vessel was to perform was to undertake good will visits to Asian countries that were friendly to the Soviet Union. For example, the ship visited Mumbai, India, between 1 to 5 June 1985.

With the dissolution of the Soviet Union on 26 December 1991, Gordelivy was transferred to the Russian Navy. On 5 July 1994, due to wear and tear, and a lack of funds to pay for the necessary repairs, Gordelivy was decommissioned and sent back to Vladivostok. On 6 October, the ship was sold to a South Korean firm and then was towed away on 27 June the following year to be broken up.

References

Citations

Bibliography

 
 
 
 
 
 
 
 
 
 
 

1978 ships
Cold War frigates of the Soviet Union
Krivak-class frigates
Ships built at Yantar Shipyard
Ships built in the Soviet Union